The 1989 Cronulla-Sutherland Sharks season was the 23rd in the club's history. They competed in the NSWRL's 1989 Winfield Cup premiership as well as the 1989 Panasonic Cup.

Ladder

References

Cronulla-Sutherland Sharks seasons
Cronulla-Sutherland Sharks season